Miscogaster is a genus of chalcid wasps.

References 

 Formation of family group names using the stem of-gaster, with special reference to names based on Miscogaster and Sphegigaster (Hymenoptera: Chalcidoidea …RA Burks, Zootaxa, 2012

External links 

 Miscogaster at dyntaxa.se

Pteromalidae
Hymenoptera genera